Dane Hutchinson (born 8 October 1986) is a New Zealand first-class cricketer who plays for Wellington.

References

External links
 

1986 births
Living people
New Zealand cricketers
Wellington cricketers
Cricketers from Brisbane